You Had To Be a Gypsy (Spanish: Gitana tenías que ser) is a 1953 Mexican-Spanish romantic comedy film directed by Rafael Baledón and starring Pedro Infante, Carmen Sevilla and Estrellita Castro.

Plot 
Pastora de los Reyes (Carmen Sevilla) is a beautiful Spanish woman who arrives in Mexico hired to film a movie. The main protagonists will receive her at the airport, among them is the man who will play the heartthrob, Pablo, (Pedro Infante), a little-known mariachi who has been chosen to turn him into a new idol. Automatically, both of them don't like each other and during the filming there are discussions, discussions that lead to a deep love.

Cast 
 Pedro Infante as Pablo Mendoza
 Carmen Sevilla as Pastora de los Reyes
 Estrellita Castro as Tía Paca
 Ángel Garasa as Tío
 Pedro de Aguillón as Chalío
 José Jasso as Tito del Valle
 Florencio Castelló as Primo Tumbita
 Carlos Múzquiz as Productor
 Chula Prieto as Marta Avilés
 Armando Calvo
 Eulalio González as Mariachi
 Elvira Lodi as Maquillista
 José Pardavé as Vendedor
 José Pidal as Ingeniero sonido
 Roberto G. Rivera as Mariachi
 Ernesto Velázquez
 Hernán Vera as Dueño de la tasca

References

Bibliography 
 Heredia, Juanita. Transnational Latina Narratives in the Twenty-first Century. Palgrave Macmillan, 2009.

External links 
 

1953 films
1953 romantic comedy films
Mexican romantic comedy films
Spanish romantic comedy films
1950s Spanish-language films
Films directed by Rafael Baledón
Mexican black-and-white films
Spanish black-and-white films
1950s Spanish films
1950s Mexican films